Shandongemys is an extinct genus of turtle from the Late Cretaceous period of Shandong, China. Its fossils were found in the Wangshi Group.

References

Cretaceous turtles
Testudinoidea
Extinct turtles